Johnson C. Smith University is a streetcar station in Charlotte, North Carolina. The at-grade island platform on Beatties Ford Road is a stop along the CityLynx Gold Line, serving Johnson C. Smith University and Five Points.

Location 
Johnson C. Smith University station is located on Beatties Ford Road, flanked by nearby Mechanics and Farmers Bank (M&F Bank) and Johnson C. Smith University. Five Points, the intersection of Beatties Ford Road, Rozzelles Ferry Road, State Street, West Fifth Street, and West Trade Street, is one of the oldest intersections in the Mecklenburg County and the gateway to West End. With the university and various businesses at its core, it connects the historically black neighborhoods of Biddleville and Seversville, while also being  from Uptown Charlotte.

History 
Johnson C. Smith University station was approved as a Gold Line Phase 2 stop in 2013. In tandem with the project, the Five Points Public Plaza project adds improvements to the area including a new public plaza, landscaping, pedestrian lighting, wider sidewalks, and various artwork; total cost of $5.5 million (2021 US dollars). Construction began in Fall 2016 and was slated to open in early-2020, but various delays pushed out the opening till mid-2021. The station opened to the public on August 30, 2021.

Station layout 
The station consists of an island platform with two passenger shelters; a crosswalk and ramp provide platform access from Beatties Ford Road. The station's passenger shelters house two art installations by George Bates. The windscreens are titled: The Worth of That, is That Which It Contains and That is This, and This With Thee Remains. The title comes from a 1954 JCSU yearbook excerpt referencing Shakespeare's sonnet 74. The micro and macro figures and images share the specific and general history of the area.

References

External links
 
 Historic West End

Lynx Gold Line stations
Railway stations in the United States opened in 2021
2021 establishments in North Carolina
Railway stations in North Carolina at university and college campuses
Johnson C. Smith University